The Yalden's vlei rat (Otomys yaldeni) is a species of rodent in the family Muridae. It is found in the Bale Mountains, in southwestern Ethiopia.

Conservation 

It is listed as "Vulnerable" by the IUCN due to being known from less than 10 locations and the reduction of the habitat of the species.

References

Mammals described in 2011
Mammals of Ethiopia